Kenya participated at the 1987 All-Africa Games held in the city of Nairobi, at the Moi International Sports Centre in Kasarani. It participated with  athletes in 14 sports and won 63 medals in total.

Medal summary

Medal table

Gold Medal

Silver Medal

Bronze Medal

References

1987
1987 in Kenyan sport
Nations at the 1987 All-Africa Games